Gutian railway station is a railway station in Gutian County, Ningde, Fujian, China. It is an intermediate stop on the Nanping–Fuzhou railway.

History
Passenger transportation ended in April 2020.

References

Railway stations in Fujian